2012 Sevens Grand Prix Series was the 11th round of the Sevens Grand Prix Series (formerly known as the European Sevens Championship) for rugby sevens organised by the FIRA – Association of European Rugby. The series was held in three phases  (GPS 1-3) hosted by France (Lyon), Russia (Moscow) and Denmark (Odense).
The tournament was won by France, who defeated Portugal 21–12 in the final. England, winner of the first two phases of the tournament, were considered to be favourites but eliminated by France in the quarter-finals.
England were the overall champions of the tournament.

Qualification
The top 12 teams in 2011 qualified for GPS 1 in Lyon. Team rankings after GPS 1 decided the standings for GPS 2 in Moscow, which decided rankings for GPS 3. For GPS 3, Denmark got direct 16th spot and three more teams from Division A promoted for the Grand Prix Series.

Results

GPS 1
The twelve teams were divided into two pools (A and B), with six members each. Each of the teams played with the other members in its pool once and then the two top teams in each of the two pools moved over to semifinals, the winners of which played against each other in the finals.

Portugal and England succeeded to final. Portugal lost only one pool (pool A) match against France with a points difference of nil to 31, whilst English team did not lose a single match. In the semifinals, England played against fellow home nation Wales and Portugal faced Spanish team. The final of Grand Prix Series 1 was played in between England and Portugal on 3 June 2012, which was won 14–26 by England and thus won the first leg of the 2012 Sevens Grand Prix Series.

Final match details

GPS 2
The Grand Prix Series 2 held in Luzhniki Stadium, Moscow, on 30 June and 1 July 2012. England and France were the top teams of pool A and pool B, respectively. Both of the teams won all their pool matches. England defeated Spain in the semifinal with a points difference of 22 to 7, and France entered the final after winning the lowest-scoring match of the GPS 2 against Russia, winning the match by 7–0. The final of the GPS 2 held on 1 July between England and France, which was won by the English team by 21–15.

Final match details

GPS 3
Sixteen teams participated in the Grand Prix Series 3 held in Odense on 7 and 8 July 2012. It was the final phase of the 2012 Sevens Grand Prix Series. The sixteen teams were divided into four pools (A, B, C and D), with four members each. Each of the teams played with the other members in its pool once and then the two top teams in each of the four pools moved over to quarter-finals. The winner of each quarter-final match succeeded to semifinals and the winners of which played against each other in the finals.

England, winner of the first two rounds of the competition, were considered to be the favourites, but they lost to France in quarter-finals. In the final, France and Portugal competed for the Championship Cup. France, maintaining their winning streak, defeated Portugal by 21–12.

Final match details

Final standings

Notes

References

2010
International rugby union competitions hosted by Russia
International rugby union competitions hosted by Denmark
International rugby union competitions hosted by France
European
2011–12 in European rugby union
2011–12 in French rugby union
2012 in Russian rugby union
2012 in Danish sport